Hinkle is an unincorporated community in Hardin County, Tennessee. Hinkle is located on Tennessee State Route 421, south of Sardis.

References

Unincorporated communities in Hardin County, Tennessee
Unincorporated communities in Tennessee